Araeophylla lachtensis is a species of moth in the family Gelechiidae. It was described by Nikolay Grigoryevich Erschoff in 1877. It is found in Russia.

References

Araeophylla
Moths described in 1877
Moths of Asia